Beauregard Town, also known as Beauregard Town Historic District, is a historic district in downtown Baton Rouge, Louisiana, anchored by Government Street.  It was commissioned in 1806 by Elias Beauregard, and was listed on the National Register of Historic Places in 1980. It is the second-oldest neighborhood in Baton Rouge (after Spanish Town).

Beauregard Town is the area bounded by North Boulevard, South Boulevard, East Boulevard, and on the west by Saint Louis Street. Government Street (or the "Grand Rue" as Beauregard wanted it) runs through the middle of Beauregard Town, with four streets — Beauregard, Grandpre, Penalvert, and Somerulos — approaching it on diagonal angles in the form of an "X", typical of the European manner of town design at the time. Its boundaries were increased twice in 1983, and once more in 2000.

Those streets are named for Beauregard himself, for Don Carlos Louis Boucher de Grand Pré (the Spanish administrator in 1806), for Roman Catholic Bishop Luis de Penalver (the bishop in 1806), and for the Marquis de Someruelos, Captain General of Cuba. Beauregard named other streets after rulers: Philip, Louis, Ferdinand, Charles, Napoleon, and Maximilian (several of these namesakes became saints through later translation error). Other streets Beauregard named after countries and continents: Spain, France, America, and Europe.

Historic homes in Beauregard Town include the Governor Henry L. Fuqua House (circa 1834) and the Williams House (circa 1890), both on Napoleon Street, as well as the Judge Robert D. Beale House (circa 1840) on the corner of St. Louis and Government streets. It includes the Old Louisiana Governor's Mansion, separately listed on the National Register.

The first 1983 increase added the privately owned Levy Hay Warehouse, built in 1920, on Front Street. The second 1983 increase added the state-owned Armour Building, built in 1929, on Mayflower Street. The 2000 increase added state-owned houses of Bungalow/Craftsman and Queen Anne architecture.

See also
Old Louisiana Governor's Mansion, included in the Beauregard Town Historic District
National Register of Historic Places listings in East Baton Rouge Parish, Louisiana

References

External links
 

Historic districts on the National Register of Historic Places in Louisiana
Neighborhoods in Baton Rouge, Louisiana
Colonial Revival architecture in Louisiana
Neoclassical architecture in Louisiana
Queen Anne architecture in Louisiana
National Register of Historic Places in East Baton Rouge Parish, Louisiana